Little Hatchet Mountains is a mountain range in Hidalgo and Grant Counties, New Mexico. The range trends north and south between Hatchita Valley to the east and Playas Valley to the west.

References

Mountain ranges of New Mexico
Mountain ranges of Grant County, New Mexico
Mountain ranges of Hidalgo County, New Mexico